The Misfits is a boxed set of material by the horror punk band the Misfits, released in 1996 by Caroline Records. Packaged in a coffin-shaped, velvet-lined box, the set includes four compact discs covering most of the band's recorded material from the years when Glenn Danzig was their singer and songwriter. It also includes a "Fiend Club" pin and a booklet containing photographs, song lyrics, a discography, and a history of the band written by their photographer and associate Eerie Von. The exterior cover of the booklet was illustrated by artist Dave McKean.

The four CDs of the set include almost all of the material written and recorded by the Misfits between 1977 and 1983. The first disc includes tracks from the compilation albums Misfits (1986 - referred to in this set as Collection I) and Collection II (1995). The second disc includes another compilation, Legacy of Brutality (1985), as well as the albums Evilive (1987) and Earth A.D./Wolfs Blood (1983). The third disc is composed of tracks recorded during the band's studio sessions, some of which had previously released on the "Bullet" and "Night of the Living Dead" singles but most of which had never before been released. The fourth disc comprises the Static Age album, which had been recorded in 1978 but had never before been released in its entirety.

The album Walk Among Us (1982) was not included in the boxed set, as it was the only album to which Caroline Records did not hold distribution rights. Additionally the set omits three tracks from the Static Age sessions which had been recorded but were never mixed: "She", "Spinal Remains", and "In the Doorway". These tracks were mixed and included with Static Age when it was released as a separate album in 1997.

History 
Prior to the release of the boxed set most of the Misfits' material had been scattered amongst various albums, EPs, and singles, many of which had gone out of print. There were also numerous tracks that had been recorded during the band's active period from 1977 to 1983 but had never been released. The majority of their material had been issued by singer and songwriter Glenn Danzig's label Plan 9 Records. Danzig holds writing credits on all of the songs from these years, and held the rights to the material through the label. The one notable exception was the band's 1982 album Walk Among Us, which was released by the Slash Records subsidiary imprint Ruby Records. After the band's breakup in 1983 Danzig continued to issue Misfits material through Plan 9, including the studio album Earth A.D./Wolfs Blood (1983), which had been recorded prior to the breakup, the "Die, Die My Darling" single (1984), and the live album Evilive (1987). He also released the compilation album Legacy of Brutality in 1985, consisting of unreleased Misfits material on which he had overdubbed new guitar and bass tracks. Caroline Records also released the compilation album Misfits in 1986. Also in 1986 Slash Records was sold to London Records, who distributed their releases in the United States through Warner Bros. Records and elsewhere through Mercury Records. This meant that the distribution rights to Walk Among Us were now in the hands of London, Warner, and Mercury.

Throughout the late 1980s and early 1990s, brothers and former Misfits members Jerry Only and Doyle Wolfgang von Frankenstein were engaged in a number of legal battles with Glenn Danzig over writing credits on the Misfits' material, as well as the rights to the Misfits name and imagery. These culminated in an out-of-court settlement in 1995 which allowed Only and Doyle to once again record and perform as the Misfits, sharing merchandising rights with Danzig. As a condition of the settlement Plan 9 Records was dissolved and Caroline Records acquired the distribution rights to all of the Misfits' material with the exception of Walk Among Us, which was still held by London, Warner, and Mercury. Caroline promptly released Collection II, which Danzig had been compiling for several years. The Collection II title led the previous compilation, Misfits, to be more commonly referred to as Collection I. The boxed set was then released in 1996, collecting all of the material to which Caroline held distribution rights. To celebrate its release Generation Records in New York City held an in-store autograph signing with Jerry Only, Doyle, former Misfits members Franché Coma, Jim Catania, and Bobby Steele, and newly recruited Michale Graves and Dr. Chud who would be part of the new Misfits lineup.

Track listing

See also 
 Misfits discography

References 

Misfits (band) compilation albums
1996 compilation albums
Caroline Records compilation albums
Horror punk compilation albums